Luís Idorildo Netto da Cunha (born April 6, 1974 in Cachoeira do Sul), or simply Luisinho Netto, is a Brazilian former right back.

Honours
 Brazilian Champions Cup: 1996
  Campeonato Paranaense in 1998, 2000 and 2002 with Clube Atlético Paranaense
 South Minas Cup: 2001
  Campeonato Pernambucano in 2008 with Sport Club do Recife
  Copa do Brasil in 2008 with Sport Club do Recife

Contract

External links
 
  
 zerozero.pt 

1974 births
Living people
Brazilian footballers
São Paulo FC players
Club Athletico Paranaense players
Sport Club Internacional players
Avaí FC players
Criciúma Esporte Clube players
Association football defenders